Albertha "Bep" Weeteling (born 28 December 1946) is a retired Dutch swimmer who won a bronze medal in the 4 × 100 m freestyle relay at the 1966 European Aquatics Championships. She also competed in four freestyle and backstroke disciplines at the 1964 and 1968 Summer Olympics but was eliminated in the preliminaries. She won two silver medals at the 1965 Summer Universiade, in the 400 m freestyle and 100 m backstroke.

Bep is the younger sister of the former swimmer Jan Weeteling who also participated in the 1964 Olympics.

References

1946 births
Living people
Dutch female backstroke swimmers
Dutch female freestyle swimmers
Olympic swimmers of the Netherlands
Swimmers at the 1964 Summer Olympics
Swimmers at the 1968 Summer Olympics
Sportspeople from Zaanstad
European Aquatics Championships medalists in swimming
Universiade medalists in swimming
Universiade silver medalists for the Netherlands
Medalists at the 1965 Summer Universiade
20th-century Dutch women
21st-century Dutch women